George Ernest Wood (6 October 1888 – 1 August 1966) was a Liberal party member of the House of Commons of Canada. He was born in Onondaga, Ontario and became a farmer by career.

Wood attended secondary school number 4 in Onondaga. He became a regional councillor for Brant County, Ontario and also served in township and school councils.

He was first elected to Parliament at the Brant riding in the 1935 general election and re-elected there in 1940. Wood was defeated by John A. Charlton of the Progressive Conservative party in the 1945 election.

Electoral record

References

External links
 
 Members of Parliament (Brant) at Brantford Public Library

1888 births
1966 deaths
Canadian farmers
Liberal Party of Canada MPs
Members of the House of Commons of Canada from Ontario
Ontario municipal councillors
People from the County of Brant